Elections of the Brisbane City Council in Queensland, Australia, were held on Saturday, 27 March 2004 to elect a councillor to each of the local government area's 26 wards and the direct election of the Lord Mayor of Brisbane.

The election resulted in the election of Campbell Newman of the Liberal Party as Lord Mayor, defeating the Labor Party incumbent, Tim Quinn, by 2.5% of the mayoral two-party-preferred vote. The Liberals won 9 wards to Labor's 17. Newman became the first Liberal Lord Mayor since Sallyanne Atkinson's narrow defeat in 1991.

Results

Mayoral election

Councillor elections

References 

2004
2004 elections in Australia
2000s in Brisbane
March 2004 events in Australia